Group 20 is a rugby league competition in the region of Griffith, New South Wales, Australia. The competition is played in five grades, with these being Under 16s, Under 18s, Women's League-Tag, Reserve Grade and First Grade.

Currently, a home and away season consisting of eighteen rounds is played. The best five teams then play-off according to the McIntyre system, culminating in the Group 20 Grand Final, which is traditionally held at E.W. Moore Oval in Griffith, currently known as Solar Mad Stadium for sponsorship purposes.

The defending premiers are the Leeton Greenies, who won their seventh title in 2022 after finishing the regular season in second place.

Current clubs 
There are currently nine clubs in the competition, three of which are located in the City of Griffith, where the competition is based. The size of the towns competing varies in size, from Griffith and Leeton at 25,000 and 11,000 respectively, to Yenda and Yanco at 1,000 and 250 people respectively.

Map

Previous clubs

First Grade Grand Finals

Ladies League Tag Grand Finals

Reserve Grade Grand Finals

Under 18's Grand Finals

Under 16's Grand Finals

Best & Fairest Winners

Ray Thorpe Medal

Ian Herd Memorial Rookie of the Year

Rising Star Award

Juniors

Group 20 Junior Rugby League
 Coleambally-Darlington Point JRL
 Griffith Waratahs Tigers Juniors
 Griffith Panthers JRL
 Hay Magpies JRL
 Leeton Raiders JRL
 Narrandera Lizards (Seniors are in Group 17)
 Tullibigeal-Lake Cargelligo Sharks JRL
 Yenda Blueheelers JRL

Juniors playing in NRL
Griffith
Shaun Spence
Andrew Fifita
David Fifita
Simon Bonetti
Michael Henderson
 Leeton
Jeff Robson 
Mark Nicholls
Yanco
David Barnhill

Sources

See also

Rugby League Competitions in Australia

References

Sport in the Riverina
Rugby league competitions in New South Wales